Super Gran is a fictional series about a grandmother with super powers. Initially a series of books written by Forrest Wilson, a children's television show was adapted by Jenny McDade and produced by Tyne Tees Television for Children's ITV. The title character was played by Gudrun Ure, with Iain Cuthbertson as her nemesis, The Scunner Campbell. It originally ran from 1985 to 1987.

Two series, each consisting of thirteen episodes, were produced, alongside a Christmas special. All episodes have been released on DVD by Network. The show inspired two computer games.

Premise 

An elderly grandmother, Granny Smith (Gudrun Ure), acquires superpowers when she is accidentally hit by a magic ray created by Inventor Black (Bill Shine). In the guise of 'Super Gran', she protects the residents of the fictional town of Chiselton from villains such as Roderick 'Scunner' Campbell (Iain Cuthbertson) and his gang, The Muscles (Alan Snell and Brian Lewis) and Tub (Lee Marshall, Jason Carrielies). Super Gran was usually accompanied by her grandson Willard (Iam Towell, Michael Graham) and Inventor Black's assistant Edison (Holly English, Samantha Duffy).

Episodes were narrated by Bill McAllister.

Production

Inception 

Super Gran was created by author Forrest Wilson. He says that the character was a combination of three characters: Pansy Potter from The Beano, his own mother-in-law, and an unnamed Scottish actress who looked and sounded like he imagined the character should. The first book was published in 1978, followed by several others, many illustrated by David McKee. Following the television series' success, Wilson adapted McDade's scripts as: Television Adventures of Super Gran, More Television Adventures of Super Gran, and Super Gran to the Rescue. Wilson, with Graham Kennedy, also released Super Gran: The Picture Book.

Gudrun Ure read Super Gran: Complete & Unabridged  for an audiobook release in 1991. Tyne Tees published an annual in 1985.

There were some significant differences between the books and the TV series. The most notable was the character of Inventor Black. Although he was an ally of Super Gran in the TV series he was the primary antagonist in Wilson's original prose.

Filming 

The show was filmed in various locations around North East England, including Tynemouth, Whitley Bay, South Shields and Beamish Museum. Inventor Black's laboratory was housed in an empty church on Tynemouth Front Street, which became Land of the Green Ginger. Sets were housed in an old warehouse in North Shields; its corrugated roof caused sound difficulties when it rained. A stone cottage in Church Way, Earsdon, near Whitley Bay, was used as Super Gran's home. A huge crane used to hoist Super Gran into her flying position was parked in the neighbouring school.

Gudrun Ure, who was 59 when she first appeared in the show, had only one stunt double and did a lot of stunts herself. Tyne Tees executive Andrea Wonfor said that they 'used to do all the special effects with trampolines and things.' Filming the Christmas special and the second series took about nine months of 10-hour days (one hour for lunch), beginning in April 1986.  Sue Sweeney, who appeared in many episodes, recalls that she "did everything from sunbathing on the beach at Cullercoats in the rain to a Gorilla at the fancy dress party."

The young actors were all local children from the Newcastle area, and the Scunner's two toughies (Alan Snell and Brian Lewis) were local stand-up comics who performed in clubs at night. Many guest stars appeared on the programme, including George Best, Spike Milligan, Eric Bristow, Roy Kinnear and Geoff Capes. It was Patrick Troughton and Charles Hawtrey's final screen appearances.

Following production, memorabilia from the show was displayed at The Land of Green Ginger shopping centre in Tynemouth. After owner Gordon Reed put the props up for sale after deciding to revamp the mall, local electrician Mark Simms bought Super Gran's flying bike and magic ray machine for £403.

The theme song was performed by Billy Connolly. The full version was released as a single in March 1985 and reached number 32 in the UK singles chart.

Episodes 

The transmission of the first episode in 1985 was preceded by a "making-of" documentary.

Series one

Christmas special

Series 2

Reception and legacy 

Super Gran won an Emmy, and sold to over 60 countries worldwide. According to director Tony Kysh, "Tyne Tees was one of the first Western companies to sell to China TV where Super Gran was a big success." The show became a ratings hit in Cuba in the early 2000s (decade), where the show was redubbed into Spanish.

The character of Super Gran came seventh in The Glasgow Herald'''s 2003 poll, "The Most Scottish Person In The World". The University of Nottingham cited Super Gran as an example of perceptions of grandmothers 'being reshaped by socio-cultural messages as well as personal experience.'

Two videos were released, each containing three episodes. The first series was released by Network in a 2-DVD set on 10 August 2009, and the second series on 16 May 2011. The Whitley Bay Playhouse scheduled a Super Gran evening in February 2012, featuring classic episodes, a making-of documentary, photographs and props.

 Special effects and production standards 

The series is famous for its 'special effects' (Super Gran's ability to jump high and walk/run quickly) and low production standards. This was due mostly to the low budget and quick turnaround time needed to finish an episode.
The most used 'special effect' was Super Gran's ability to jump very high (or at least higher than normal) and was achieved using a trampoline and trick camera angles. Another well-used effect was 'Super Gran walking/running quickly' which usually involved a stunt double walking away from the camera quickly with a 'trailing' visual effect emanating from the retreating figure, making it appear that she was walking/running so fast that her afterimage was momentarily being left behind. To further accentuate the effect, other characters (usually the children and Inventor Black) would be required to 'run' after her, complaining that she was walking/running too quickly.

The most celebrated effect, featured in episode 1.2 has often been ascribed to the trick camera angles used to make the Skimmer appear to fly. Contrary to fan belief, the prop was not capable of flying but remained grounded throughout the episode – only appearing to take off when driven on the back of a lorry.

The use of local accents proved problematic – some actors accentuated their own speech to sound more Scottish (and provide continuity with Scottish actors Cuthbertson and Ure) while others were more comfortable with their Geordie accents. The child actors especially found losing their Geordie accents difficult and maintained them across their scenes. The actor who played Tub in Series One even made a catchphrase with his heavy accent – "What do we dee noo, Unk Ill?" ("What do we do now, Uncle?")

Super Gran's most celebrated power is to hear (or 'receive') communications from long-distance if the person is distressed enough. To more clearly 'receive' the communication, Gudrun Ure developed an affectation holding her fingers to her forehead like horns or radio receivers. The director of the first episode liked it so much he suggested she keep it.

Sue Sweeney, a local celebrity who featured in many episodes, became firm friends with Gudrun Ure and once claimed the Scottish thespian's acting ability was so high she "could make you smile, squirm and scream in equal measure without saying a word."

Spike Milligan, who guested in a Series One episode, enjoyed his time in nearby Newcastle upon Tyne so much that he became a Newcastle United Season Ticket holder right up to his death.

 Planned third series, cancellation and possible film 

A third series was planned to begin filming in early 1988 but the programme was abandoned by Tyne Tees Television in favour of increased spending on daytime gameshows such as 'Chain Letters' (which was very popular in the late 1980s).
Several episodes had been plotted and even story-boarded prior to the cancellation and included working titles "Super Gran and the Underwater Terror" (Super Gran would foil Scunner Campbell's plot to destroy Chistleton using a gigantic tidal wave), "Super Gran and the Miniscule Marionette" (Inventor Black mistakenly miniaturizes a precious marionette heirloom and Super Gran must find a way to resize it before an important dignitary arrives to view it) and "Super Gran and the Rhyming Ruin" (the plot is unknown but would have involved filming in Tynemouth's famous ruined Priory).

The cancellation of the TV series did not dampen hopes of a motion picture version – hopes which had been alive since midway through the popular Series One. While no firm production plans ever emerged due to the cancellation, one early plot would have involved Super Gran travelling to Spain to foil an attempt by Scunner Campbell to control the 'world trade market'.

 Computer games 

Tynesoft produced two games based on the show in 1985.

The game Super Gran was an action game involving Super Gran's anti-gravity belt. It was released for the Amstrad CPC, Commodore 16, Commodore 64 and ZX Spectrum.Super Gran - The Adventure'' was a text adventure based on the show, written by Adventure Soft's Brian Howarth. The premise is that Super Gran has to save people whilst looking out for Scunner Campbell. This game was released on the Acorn Electron, BBC Micro, C16, C64 and Spectrum.

Notes

References

External links 

 Publicity photographs
 

1980s British children's television series
1985 British television series debuts
1987 British television series endings
British fantasy television series
English-language television shows
ITV children's television shows
Television shows produced by Tyne Tees Television
British television shows based on children's books
Television series by ITV Studios